Same-sex marriage is legal in Nuevo León is legal in accordance with a ruling from the Supreme Court of Justice of the Nation on 19 February 2019 that the state's ban on same-sex marriage violated the Constitution of Mexico. The ruling came into effect on 31 May 2019 upon publication in the Official Journal of the Federation. By statute, in Mexico, if any five rulings from the courts on a single issue result in the same outcome, legislatures are bound to change the law. In the case of Nuevo León, almost 20 individual amparos were decided with the same outcome, yet the state did not act. On 19 February 2019, the Supreme Court issued a definitive ruling in an action of unconstitutionality, declaring the state's same-sex marriage ban unconstitutional, void and unenforceable.

Legal history

Background

On 12 June 2015, the Mexican Supreme Court ruled that state bans on same-sex marriage are unconstitutional nationwide under Articles 1 and 4 of the Constitution of Mexico. The court's ruling is considered a "jurisprudential thesis" and did not invalidate state laws, meaning that same-sex couples denied the right to marry would still have to seek individual amparos in court. The ruling standardized the procedures for judges and courts throughout Mexico to approve all applications for same-sex marriages and made the approval mandatory.

In September 2013, a federal judge ordered the civil registry to register the marriage of a lesbian couple from Monterrey. Governor Rodrigo Medina de la Cruz said his administration would abide by the order but only for that specific case. In June 2014, it was reported that nine amparos had been filed in the state, but only one had been resolved. Oral arguments were heard in court in September 2014 concerning a collective amparo filed by 50 gay and lesbian people contesting the constitutionality of articles 147 and 291bis of the Civil Code. Article 147 described marriage as "the legal union of a man and a woman" and article 291bis similarly defined concubinage as "between a man and a woman". On 16 October 2014, the Supreme Court declared the two articles unconstitutional and gave the 50 people in question the right to marry their partner. Another collective amparo, this time involving 38 people, was approved by the First Chamber of the Supreme Court on 28 September 2016, and another, involving 118 people, was granted by the First Chamber of the Supreme Court on 19 October 2017.

On 17 February 2016, the First Chamber of the Supreme Court ordered the Governor of Nuevo León, Jaime Rodríguez Calderón, to recognize cohabitation between same-sex couples.

On 9 October 2018, the Mexican Supreme Court ruled that the Nuevo León Civil Code was unconstitutional and discriminatory in limiting marriage to different-sex couples. The court ordered the state Congress to change the law within 180 business days (i.e. by 16 April 2019). By that time, 18 amparos for same-sex marriage rights had been approved in the state. However, in February 2019, prior to the April deadline, the Supreme Court ruled in an action of unconstitutionality against the state, legalizing same-sex marriage in Nuevo León.

Legislative action
On 17 June 2015, the New Alliance Party announced its intention to introduce a same-sex marriage bill to the Congress of Nuevo León. The bill was presented on 22 June by Deputy María Dolores Leal Cantú. An independent congressman subsequently announced his intention to submit a civil union proposal with the support of the ruling National Action Party (PAN). Legislators announced that the marriage bill would be voted on sometime in September 2016, but this did not happen. In November 2017, after LGBT groups organized a protest march in favor of same-sex marriage in front of the Congress building, the state's PAN leader reiterated the party's opposition to same-sex marriage and announced it would continue to block debate on the marriage bill.

Action of unconstitutionality (2018–2019)

In February 2018, the National Human Rights Commission filed an action of unconstitutionality (acción de inconstitucionalidad; docketed 29/2018) against the state of Nuevo León, contesting the constitutionality of articles 140, 147 and 148 of the Civil Code. The Congress of Nuevo León had recently amended state family law but while doing so did not repeal the state's ban on same-sex marriage. The Commission took this opportunity to file the action of unconstitutionality. Article 147 described marriage as "the legal union of a man and a woman", and articles 140 and 148 required "the man and the woman" to be at least 18 years of age. This lawsuit sought to fully legalize same-sex marriage in Nuevo León, similarly to what had happened in the states of Chiapas (in case 32/2016), Puebla (in case 29/2016) and Jalisco (in case 28/2015).

On 19 February 2019, the Supreme Court of Justice of the Nation ruled unanimously in a 10–0 vote that the articles of the Civil Code limiting marriage to opposite-sex couples were unconstitutional under Articles 1 and 4 of the Constitution of Mexico, legalizing same-sex marriage and adoption by same-sex couples in the state of Nuevo León. Governor Jaime Rodríguez Calderón expressed his personal opposition to the ruling, and religious groups opposed to same-sex marriage asked Rodríguez Calderón to override or ignore the ruling; however, he did not have the power to do so. Congress was officially notified of the ruling on 26 February. The state's ban on same-sex marriage violated Article 1 of the Constitution, which reads:

The ruling officially came into force on 31 May 2019 upon publication in the Official Journal of the Federation. Prior to the publication date, the civil registry nonetheless began processing marriage applications from same-sex couples and issuing marriage licenses. The first same-sex couple to marry were Janeth Oliva and Amatzú Aranda on 11 March 2019 in San Nicolás de los Garza.

Marriage statistics
The following table shows the number of same-sex marriages performed in Nuevo León since legalization in 2019 as reported by the National Institute of Statistics and Geography.

Public opinion
A 2017 opinion poll conducted by  found that 48% of Nuevo León residents supported same-sex marriage, while 49% were opposed.

According to a 2018 survey by the National Institute of Statistics and Geography, 44% of the Nuevo León public opposed same-sex marriage.

See also

 Same-sex marriage in Mexico
 LGBT rights in Mexico

References

External links
 Acción de Inconstitucionalidad 29/2018, Supreme Court ruling declaring Nuevo León's same-sex marriage ban unconstitutional (in Spanish).

Nuevo León
Nuevo León
2019 in LGBT history